PBA Esports Bakbakan is an esports league in the Philippines. It is organized by the Philippine Basketball Association (PBA) in partnership with Dark League Studios. The league consists of the esport squads of the PBA's twelve franchise teams. The first season will feature Mobile Legends: Bang Bang.

History
The Philippine Basketball Association (PBA) has planned to organize esports games in-between its league games during its 46th season in 2021. However the COVID-19 pandemic caused such plan to be placed on hold. In 2022, the PBA revisited its plans to get involved in esports and accepted an invitation by Dark League Studios to check their Kings League tournament. The PBA would enter in an entered a formal partnership with Dark League Studios in October 2022.

The PBA would launch an esports league, the PBA Esports Bakbakan, in January 2023. The tournament would be held in partnership with Dark League Studios. The inaugural season would feature the PBA's twelve franchise team with Mobile Legends: Bang Bang as the video game title featured. The draft for the first tournament was held on February 13, 2023.

Teams

References

Esports competitions in the Philippines
 
2023 establishments in the Philippines
Sports leagues established in 2023
Professional sports leagues in the Philippines
Mobile Legends: Bang Bang competitions